Kimberley is a rural locality and town in the local government areas of Meander Valley and Kentish in the Launceston and North-west and west regions of Tasmania. The 2016 census has a population of 149 for the state suburb of Kimberley.
It is about midway between the towns of Sheffield and Deloraine.  Once a thriving village with a school, railway station, shops and two churches, it is now a collection of houses with one church (St Michael and All Angels Anglican Church) remaining.

There are clear springs running all year in the area. The White Rock Vineyard is close to the township. There is also an olive grove. The area is known for its dairy farms, beef breeding and fattening, prime lamb production, some cropping and irrigation.

History
Kimberley was gazetted as a locality in 1965.

Geography
The Mersey River forms part of the southern boundary, flows through from south to north, and then forms part of the northern boundary.
One of the attractions of the area is the Kimberley Warm Springs.

Kimberley is the site of the Dasher River Conservation Area.

Road infrastructure
Route B13 (Railton Road) runs through from north-east to north. Route C156 (Bridle Track Road) enters from the north and runs south-west until it exits. Route C160 (Weegena Road) starts at an intersection with B13 in the town and runs south until it exits.

Notable people
Former Papua New Guinean politician Barry Holloway was born and buried at Kimberley.

References

Localities of Meander Valley Council
Localities of Kentish Council
Towns in Tasmania